The Voice of Finland (season 3) is the third season of the Finnish reality singing competition based on The Voice format. The season premiered on Nelonen on January 3, 2014.

The coaches are singer Anne Mattila, glam rock singer Michael Monroe, singer Mira Luoti of PMMP, and rapper Elastinen. Axl Smith hosts the program.

Overview
The series consists of three phases: a blind audition, a battle phase, and live performance shows. Four judges/coaches, all noteworthy recording artists, choose teams of contestants through a blind audition process where the coaches cannot see, but only hear the auditioner. Each judge has the length of the auditioner's performance (about one minute) to decide if he or she wants that singer on his or her team; if two or more judges want the same singer (as happens frequently), the singer has the final choice of coach. Some singers perform behind a curtain which falls only after the song is finished.

Each team of contestants is mentored and developed by its respective coach. In the second stage, called the battle phase, coaches have two of their team members battle against each other directly by singing the same song together, with the coach choosing which team member to advance from each of four individual "battles" into the first live round. This season, coaches are allowed to steal two eliminated artists each from other coaches.

In the final phase, the remaining contestants compete against each other in live broadcasts. Within the first live round, the surviving acts from each team again compete head-to-head, with public votes determining one of two acts from each team that will advance to the final eight, while the coach chooses which of the remaining acts comprises the other performer remaining on the team. The television audience and the coaches have equal say 50/50 in deciding who moves on to the semi-final. In the semi-final the results are based on a mix of public vote, advance vote by phone, sms, Deezer listening and Ruutu.fi viewing of the previous week's performances, and voting of coaches. Each carries equal weight of 100 points for a total of 300 points. With one team member remaining for each coach, the (final 4) contestants compete against each other in the finale with the outcome decided by advance vote and public vote, both with equal weight of 100 points for a total of 200 points.

All finalists will release a single and the winner will receive a record deal with Universal.

Episodes

The Blind Auditions

Episode 1: January 3, 2014

Episode 2: January 10, 2014

Episode 3: January 17, 2014

Episode 4: January 24, 2014

Episode 5: January 31, 2014

Episode 6: February 7, 2014

The Wildcards

Battle rounds
The Battle rounds will be broadcast over four episodes on February 14 - March 7, 2014. Each coach will be joined by an advisor, with Michael Monroe being joined by Eicca Toppinen of Apocalyptica, Mattila by producer Petri Munck, Mira Luoti will be joined by singer-songwriter Maija Vilkkumaa and Elastinen will be joined once again by producer Jukka Immonen.
Each coach will be given two steals, they can hit their button as many times as they like, but can only steal two artists from other coaches.

Colour key

Episode 7 (February 14)

Episode 8 (February 21)

Episode 9 (February 28)

Episode 10 (March 7)

The Knockouts

Color key:

Live shows
The live performance shows were broadcast live from Logomo, Turku between March 28 and April 18.

Cheek ft. Diandra, Antti Railio, and Ella Eyre performed during the quarterfinal shows, Redrama and Pauli Hanhiniemi performed in the semifinal. Paloma Faith and Sunrise Avenue performed during the final.
Colour key

Quarterfinal 1 (March 28)

Quarterfinal 2 (April 4)

Semifinal (April 11)
Competition performances

Semifinal results

Final (April 18) 
Competition performances
Each finalist performed an original song and a duet with their team coach.

Final results

 – Winner
 – Runner-up
 – 3rd/4th place

Elimination Chart

Overall

Color key
Artist's info

Result details

Reception and TV ratings
Season three premiered on January 3, 2014. The overall ratings appear to be in decline from the previous seasons. On weeks 6, 7, and 8 the program was competing against live broadcasts from the 2014 Winter Olympics from Sochi on Yle TV2. Week 9 saw the all time lowest rating for the program, when it was up against the TV premiere of a documentary film on legendary Finnish ice-hockey star Teemu Selänne on MTV3. Like on previous seasons, The Voice of Finland airs twice a week, first Friday evening at 8:00 pm and re-run on Sunday afternoon at 5:00 pm.

Notes
Rating is the average number of viewers during the program.
The latest weekly ratings contain timeshift viewing only during the same day. Older weekly ratings contain timeshift viewing during seven days.

See also
:fi:The Voice of Finland

References

External links
The Voice of Finland Official website

3
2014 Finnish television seasons
2010s Finnish television series